Hoppas på det bästa is a 2011 studio album by Swedish band Drifters.

Track listing
Hoppas på det bäst (Mats Tärnfors/Marika Lindén)
Kom tillbaks (Henrik Sethson/Mats Tärnfors/Ulf Georgsson)
Nina, fina Ballerina (Benny Andersson/Björn Ulvaeus)
Pack Up (Tim Woodcock/Eliza Doolittle/Felix Powell/George Asaf/Matthew Prime)
Hallå, jag ringer på (Thomas Berglund/Ulf Georgsson/Per Samuelsson)
Xanadu (Jeff Lynne)
Adios, Goodbye (Henrik Sethson/Mats Tärnfors/Ulf Georgsson)
En man i byrån (If You Can Put That in a Bottle) (Wilbur Meshel/Peter Himmelstrand)
Sun Street (Vinzente de la Cruz)
The Things You Do (Henrik Sethson/Thomas G:sson)
Om hela världen sjöng en sång (Roger Greenway/William Backer/Raquel Davis/Roger Cook /Lennart Reuterskiöld)
September (Anders Wigelius/Ulf Georgsson)

Charts

References

2011 albums
Drifters (Swedish band) albums
Swedish-language albums